Surval Montreux is an international all girls boarding school in Montreux, Switzerland. 
 
In addition to its own program, the school provides accommodation and academic classes to students of Institut Villa Pierrefeu, Switzerland's last traditional finishing school. Surval Montreux is a former rival of Pierrefeu, as it was originally established as the Surval Mont-Fleuri finishing school in 1961.

The school was renamed to Surval Montreux in 2012 after it was bought by Bellevue Education. The parent company is Bellevue Education International Limited. Bellevue bought the school as part of acquisitions driven by funding derived largely from Tarek Obaid, the founder of the oil company PetroSaudi, which has been implicated in the 1Malaysia Development Berhad scandal. Bellevue Education was acquired by GEMS Education in 2018, and is a UK and European subsidiary of the Group. In 2019, CVC acquired a 30% stake in GEMS Education, which also includes its stake in Bellevue Education.

Academics
SM begins with Foundation Year. The majority of Foundation students start at age 13, but English language learners may start at age 12 and spend a year working on their English before joining the rest of the school. After Foundation Year, there are two academic tracks. Students either earn an American high school diploma or take the IGCSE and A-Levels

SM offers a pre-university program for students aged 17 to 19, the Surval Swiss Gap Experience.

Accreditation
SM's (upper) secondary education (Middle and High School) is not approved as a Mittelschule/Collège/Liceo by the Swiss Federal State Secretariat for Education, Research and Innovation (SERI).

References

External links

Girls' schools in Switzerland
Boarding schools in Switzerland
International schools in Switzerland
Secondary schools in Switzerland
Montreux
Buildings and structures in the canton of Vaud